Georgi Ivanov Atanasov (25 July 1933 – 31 March 2022) was a Bulgarian politician and a leading member of the Bulgarian Communist Party who served as Prime Minister from 1986 to 1990. Atanasov supported the move to oust Todor Zhivkov as Chairman of the State Council, joining Petar Mladenov in leading the opposition. In November 1992, he was sentenced to ten years imprisonment for embezzlement, although he was pardoned in 1994.

Atanasov died at 31 March 2022, at the age of 88 in Sofia.

Honours and awards 

Order of Georgi Dimitrov

Order of Karl Marx

References

 

 

1933 births
2022 deaths
People from Parvomay
Bulgarian Communist Party politicians
Prime Ministers of Bulgaria
Sofia University alumni
Bulgarian prisoners and detainees
Prisoners and detainees of Bulgaria
Politicians convicted of embezzlement
Bulgarian politicians convicted of crimes
Heads of government who were later imprisoned
Recipients of the Order of Georgi Dimitrov